North and South is the sixth studio album by Gerry Rafferty. It was Rafferty's first studio album in six years and reunited him with producer Hugh Murphy. The album was released as an LP and CD in 1988. One of the singles was "Shipyard Town", also released on several compilation albums.

Track listing

All tracks composed and arranged by Gerry Rafferty.

 "North and South" – 6:45
 "Moonlight and Gold" – 6:10
 "Tired of Talking" – 4:09
 "Hearts Run Dry" – 6:09
 "A Dangerous Age" – 6:11
 "Shipyard Town" – 6:12
 "Winter’s Come" – 6:50
 "Nothing Ever Happens Down Here" – 3:42
 "On a Night Like This" – 6:09
 "Unselfish Love" – 5:25

Personnel 
 Gerry Rafferty – vocals (1), keyboards (1, 3, 7, 8) acoustic guitar (1, 2, 4, 9), bass (1), lead and harmony vocals (2-10), electric piano (2), organ (2), string synthesizer (5), acoustic piano intro (9), electric rhythm guitar (10), saxophone (10)
 Alan Clark – keyboards (1, 3, 5, 6, 9, 10), synthesizers (2, 5), Hammond organ (5)
 Kenny Craddock – keyboards (3, 5, 6, 7, 9, 10), Hammond organ (4, 6), synthesizers (5)
 Geraint Watkins – accordion (3, 4, 8, 9)
 Betsy Cook – electric piano (4)
 Jerry Donahue – electric guitars  (1, 4), electric guitar arpeggios (2, 7), electric guitar solo (2, 3, 5, 7, 9, 10), electric rhythm guitar (3, 5, 6, 8, 9), electric lead guitar (6, 8)
 Bryn Haworth – slide guitar (4)
 Mo Foster – bass (1), fretless bass (4)
 Pete Zorn – fretless bass (1), bass (8)
 Ian Maidman – bass (2-7, 9, 10)
 Arran Ahmun – drums, percussion
 Morris Pert – additional percussion (4)
 Ric Sanders – fiddles (1, 3, 5, 7, 8), fiddle intro (3)
 Mel Collins – saxophone (1, 5, 6)
 Andrew White – soprano saxophone intro (2)
 Davy Spillane – Uilleann pipes (1, 3, 5, 7), whistle (3, 5, 7)
 William Malone – string introduction piece (2), string arrangements (2)

Production 
 Hugh Murphy – producer, engineer 
 Gerry Rafferty – producer
 Brad Davis – remixing (1-5, 7, 9, 10)
 Greg Jackman – remixing (6, 8)
 Bill Smith Studio – sleeve design 
 World Travel – photography 
 Gered Mankowitz – back cover photography

Studios
 Recorded at Gerry's home
 Additional recording at RAK Studios and Odyssey Studios (London, UK).
 Mixed at Comforts Place (Surrey, UK).

References

External links

Gerry Rafferty albums
1988 albums
London Records albums